Richard Chester Badar (born March 8, 1943) is a former professional American football quarterback in the National Football League. He played college football for the Indiana Hoosiers.

External links
NFL.com profile

1943 births
Living people
Players of American football from Cleveland
American football quarterbacks
Indiana Hoosiers football players
Pittsburgh Steelers players
Canadian football quarterbacks
Winnipeg Blue Bombers players